T-118 was a minesweeper of the Soviet Navy during World War II and the Cold War. Upon completion she was transferred to the Soviet Union under Lend-Lease as T-118; she was never returned to the United States. Because of the Cold War, the U.S. Navy was unaware of this fate and the vessel remained on the American Naval Vessel Register until she was struck on 1 January 1983.

Career 
Armada was laid down on 18 October 1942 at Tampa, Florida, by the Tampa Shipbuilding Co.; launched on 7 December 1942; sponsored by Mrs. B. C. Crawford; and completed on 16 September 1943. She was turned over to the USSR on the day of her completion and was commissioned in the Soviet Navy as T-118. She was torpedoed and sunk in the Kara Sea on 12 August 1944 by German submarine .

Armada was carried on the American Navy List as MSF-145 after 7 February 1955 until 1 January 1983 when her name was struck.

References

External links
 NavSource Online: Mine Warfare Vessel Photo Archive – Armada (MSF 145) – ex-AM-145 – ex-AMc-122

Admirable-class minesweepers
Ships built in Tampa, Florida
1942 ships
World War II minesweepers of the United States
Admirable-class minesweepers of the Soviet Navy
World War II minesweepers of the Soviet Union
Ships sunk by German submarines in World War II
Maritime incidents in August 1944
Shipwrecks in the Kara Sea
World War II shipwrecks in the Arctic Ocean